The 1831 United States Senate special election in Pennsylvania was held on December 13, 1831. George M. Dallas was elected by the Pennsylvania General Assembly to the United States Senate.

Background
The Democratic-Republican Isaac D. Barnard was elected to the United States Senate by the General Assembly, consisting of the House of Representatives and the Senate, in December 1826. Sen. Barnard resigned on December 6, 1831, vacating the seat.

Results
Following the resignation of Sen. Isaac Barnard, the Pennsylvania General Assembly convened on December 13, 1831, to elect a new Senator to fill the vacancy. A total of eleven ballots were recorded. The results of the eleventh and final ballot of both houses combined are as follows:

|-
|-bgcolor="#EEEEEE"
| colspan="3" align="right" | Totals
| align="right" | 133
| align="right" | 100.00%
|}

References

External links
Pennsylvania Election Statistics: 1682-2006 from the Wilkes University Election Statistics Project

1831 special
Pennsylvania 1831
United States Senate 1831
United States Senate
Pennsylvania 1831
Pennsylvania